Harpa fulvomichaelensis ORGA,1998, common name the Somali harp, is a species of sea snail, a marine gastropod mollusk in the family Harpidae, the harp snails.

This name is an unaccepted name because this name was not properly published. It is listed in WoRMS because it appears on various websites

Description
The body has a very large foot, which does not fit all in the shell, the back has a half moon shape dilated, the front is elongated, measuring about 70 mm. in length and 47 mm. wide, the color of the foot is pink-cream with dark brown spots and streaks. 
The head has a small trunk on the end of which there is the mouth, the trunk is 15 mm long. On the head there are two thin tentacles, located on the side of the trunk, about which there are the eyes, the tentacles are about 20 mm. 
The pallial siphon, located anteriorly, measuring 15 mm. 
The small radula is rachiglossa, comprising a series of transverse teeth acuminata, three for the first row is a lateral tooth, the second (middle) is a tooth rachidian and the last is a lateral tooth.

The shell 
The shell is medium in size, measuring 30–35 mm. in height and 20–23 mm in length.

The shell looks not very thick, a conical spire moderately elevated, with the apex (proto), cream colored, and with the last round (or recess) large and bulging, that almost completely surrounds the previous year, the suture is well imprinted.
The stoma is very broad, with a slight notch front.
The last round has 15 globular coasts axial regularly rounded and of medium height, 2–3 mm thick on average., Coastline ending on the shoulder with small spines. These designs have a coil tawny-orange, pink and tan.
The outer lip is smooth and is constituted by the last coast, that is not sharp and is semi-rounded.
The inner lip has a slight callus transparent. The columellar lip and the columella are smooth and have brown spots.
The intercostal spaces are crossed by thin stripes, on which there is a characteristic pattern of harps in a zigzag pattern, which in this species is fawn, also among the intercostal spaces alternates a brown semi-square, located at mid-height of the intercostal space.
The shell is not particularly bright when compared with other species of the Indo-Pacific area; the core background is pink. 
As in other animals of this genus lacks the periostracum and operculum.

The Harpa fulvomichaelensis Orga, 1998 has peculiar characteristics, the coasts is rounded in section and is similar to the one that presents Harpa goodwini Rehder, 1993. 
Because of the conical spire moderately high, the size and the average number of coasts this species is placed very close to Harpa amouretta Röding, 1798. from which it differs because it does not have the ribbed triangular section. Furthermore, the opening of Harpa fulvomichaelensis is wide and rounded instead that of Harpa amouretta is semi oval and relatively narrow. 
Another species is very close Harpa kajiyamai Habe, 1970, which has a shell characterized by a very thin thickness when compared to Harpa fulvomichaelensis, also the coloring of the apex or protoconch in Harpa kajiyamai is brown, however in our cream is clear. 
The coasts of Harpa kajiyamai are little thick, measure an average between 1 and 1.5 mm. Instead of those Harpa fulvomichaelensis have a thickness greater, on average 2–3 mm.

Distribution
This marine species living off the southern coast of Somalia in Indian Ocean.

Bibliography

 ORGA Stefano (1998), "Harpa fulvomichaelensis n.sp., nuova specie di Harpide della Somalia", in IDEM Gli Arpidi. La famiglia Harpidae, MZO Edizioni, Avellino 1998, pp. 22–26.

References

Endemic fauna of Somalia
Harpidae